Padma Chaitya Bihar is a Buddhist monastery located in Butwal, Nepal. It was established in  when the Newar people came for settlement in this area. It is believed that the monastery was established before any significant settlement occurred in Butwal. The monastery is funded by the local and international volunteers.

References

Buddhist monasteries in Nepal
1914 establishments in Nepal